Rottstraße 5 Theater  is a theatre in Bochum, North Rhine-Westphalia, Germany.

Theatres in North Rhine-Westphalia